École Clément-Cormier is a Francophone high school in Bouctouche, New Brunswick, Canada.

External links
 Clement Cormier School Site

High schools in New Brunswick
Bouctouche
Education in Kent County, New Brunswick